The 2020 Russian Women's Football Championship was the 29th season of the Russian women's football top-level league. CSKA Moscow were the defending champions.

The tournament was supposed to start on March 29, but on March 17, due to the COVID-19 pandemic, the RFU decided to suspend all competitions under its auspices (include the Russian women's championship). The season was delayed until August 1, 2020.

Teams

League table

Results

Top scorers

Hat-tricks

References

External links 
 

2020
Russia
Russia
Women
Women
Association football events postponed due to the COVID-19 pandemic